The Venture of Newport 23, also called the Venture 23 and the MacGregor 23, is an American trailerable character sailboat that was designed by Roger MacGregor as a cruiser and first built in 1973. The design is intended as a miniature replica of a 19th-century pilot cutter.

Production
The design was built by MacGregor Yacht Corporation in the United States, from 1973 until 1984, but it is now out of production.

Design
The Venture of Newport 23 is a recreational keelboat, built predominantly of fiberglass, with wood trim. It is a cutter rigged sloop, with a spooned raked stem with a bowsprit, an angled transom, a transom-hung rudder controlled by a tiller and a retractable swing keel. It displaces  and carries  of iron ballast.

The boat is normally fitted with a small  outboard motor for docking and maneuvering.

The design has sleeping accommodation for five people, with a double "V"-berth in the bow cabin, a straight settee to port and a drop down dinette table to starboard that converts to a double berth in the main cabin. The galley is located on the port side just forward of the companionway ladder. The galley is equipped with a two-burner stove and a sink. The enclosed head is located just aft of the bow cabin on the starboard side.

Operational history
In a 2010 review Steve Henkel wrote, "This vessel goes by a variety of names: Venture 2: MacGregor 23, Venture of Newport, and maybe others as well. All refer to the cutter-rigged, bowspritted sailboat with the springy sheer and raked mast pictured here. Her odd looks are explained in a sales brochure saying that she is “a modern replica of the famous English and American pilot cutters of the late 1800s. Well, not in our history book, but we guess if you use your imagination you might see some sort of connection between a typical 49-foot pilot cutter drawing eight feet of water, weighing 55 tons, and able to go out in any weather, and this Venture of Newport, a mere 23 feet, drawing a foot and a half, weighing one ton, and restricted to sailing in protected waters—but not much of one. Best features: Her springy sheer gives her a jaunty look. Worst features: She won't pass muster with sailors who aren't attracted to heavily made up women. Louis Sullivan said that form follows function, and here's a good example of where it doesn't."

See also
List of sailing boat types

References

Keelboats
1970s sailboat type designs
Sailing yachts
Trailer sailers
Sailboat type designs by Roger MacGregor
Sailboat types built by the MacGregor Yacht Corporation